Ted Ross was a college football player for coach Dan McGugin's Vanderbilt Commodores football teams, selected All-Southern in 1909.

References

All-Southern college football players
Vanderbilt Commodores football players
American football guards